'Theodoor Johan Arnold van Zijll de Jong (Velp, 31 March 1836 – The Hague, 28 May 1917) was a Dutch Lieutenant General and commander of the Royal Netherlands East Indies Army

Awards and decorations
  Knight fourth class of the Military William Order (Royal Decree of 4 April 1875 no. 22)
  Knight of the Order of the Netherlands Lion
  Expedition Cross with clasps: "Honorary Sabre", "Honorable Mention", "Aceh 1873-96"
  Aceh Medal 1873–1874
  Medal for Long, Honest and Faithful Service with the figure XXXV
  Knight Grand Cross of the Order of St. Anna (Russia)

Sources
1903. G. van Steijn. Gedenkboek Koninklijke Militaire Academie. P.B. Nieuwenhuijs. Breda.
1940. G.C.E. Köffler. De Militaire Willemsorde 1815–1940. Algemene Landsdrukkerij. Den Haag.
2009. George Frederik Willem Borel. Onze vestiging in Atjeh, drogredenen zijn geen waarheid. Uitgeverij Eburon. Delft. Heruitgave van 1878. Onze vestiging in Atjeh, critisch beschreven D.A. Thieme, Den Haag en 1880. Drogredenen zijn geen waarheid. Henri J. Stemberg, Den Haag.

1836 births
1917 deaths
People from Rheden
Royal Netherlands East Indies Army generals
Royal Netherlands East Indies Army officers
Aceh War
Knights Fourth Class of the Military Order of William
Knights of the Order of the Netherlands Lion
Recipients of the Order of St. Anna